Science of Survival is a 1951 book by L. Ron Hubbard, extending his earlier writings on Dianetics. Its original subtitle was "simplified, faster dianetic techniques", although more recent editions have the subtitle "Prediction of human behavior". It is one of the canonical texts of Scientology.

The title of Science of Survival alludes to Science and Sanity, a highly popular work by Alfred Korzybski, the founder of general semantics. Hubbard acknowledged Korzybski's contributions in the book.

It has remained perpetually in print over the years, and is currently published by Bridge Publications, Inc.

Science of Survival was the follow-up to Hubbard's best-selling Dianetics: The Modern Science of Mental Health. It expanded significantly on Dianetics, setting out what Hubbard called the "dynamics of behaviour" and provided descriptions of new techniques of Dianetics processing that Hubbard described as being faster and simpler than those that he had advanced previously. In the book, Hubbard introduced two concepts that were later to become key elements of Scientology: theta and the tone scale. He also endorsed the concept of past lives.

Theta
Although Hubbard had not yet established Scientology, which was overtly presented as a religious practice, and continued to maintain that Dianetics was a scientific subject with techniques aimed towards therapeutic results, the information on "theta" in the book clearly begins to move the subject into a religious direction. Hubbard describes theta as a sort of "life energy", and contrasts it with "MEST" "matter, energy, space and time", the components of the physical universe. He discusses the concept of "entheta", or enturbulated theta, and "enMEST", or enturbulated MEST, as being confused or dysfunctional states of being, and describes how at low levels of the tone scale theta and MEST become overwhelmed by entheta and enMEST before ultimately death occurs and only enMEST remains, whilst as the tone scale is ascended theta and MEST act more and more in accord with each other until MEST is entirely overcome and pure theta is attained. This concept of a spiritual life energy entering and purifying the physical universe recalls the ideas of Gnostic religions.

Tests and results
As Hubbard tells the story in Science of Survival, in 1950 the Hubbard Dianetic Research Foundation agreed to a definitive test of claims demanded by the psychological community who wanted Dianetics to validate its claims. The claims to be tested were increased IQ, the relief of psychoses, and the relief of psychosomatic illnesses.

Hubbard said that the tests had been done using psychology's strictest psychometric protocols (Minnesota Multiphasic Test and the Wechsler-Bellevue, "Form B") with examiners Gordon Southon, Peggy Southon and Dalmyra Ibanez, Ph.D., Ed.D. Hubbard also said that their witnessed signatures were affixed to each bank of tests and that all three claims were validated by these tests and these psychometrists.

In January 1951 Hubbard published a booklet by these same alleged doctors: Dianetic Processing A Brief Survey of Research Projects and Preliminary Results by Dalmyra Ibanez, Ph.D., Ed.D., Gordon Southon, Peggy Southon and Peggy Benton In it, the authors state:

The names of the persons in this "group of psychologists" are not mentioned. The booklet presents case histories and X-rays and says that it proves that Dianetics can cure "aberrations" including manic depression, asthma, arthritis, colitis and "overt homosexuality." The booklet further says that it used twelve different tests and presents results from five, four of which came from the California Test Bureau and had according to a 1946 investigation of V. E. Ordahl of the University of California no evidence of reliability or validity.

Modern reprintings of Science of Survival (post twentieth printing) no longer contain information about this study or mention the alleged IQ gains of about ten points and other similar alleged gains.  The modern version bear a new subtitle: "Prediction of Human Behavior". Earlier editions were subtitled "Simplified, Faster Dianetic Techniques".

Body odor and the tone scale
In Science of Survival, Hubbard discusses the correlation between body odor, bodily substances, and one's position on the emotional tone scale:

Controversy
One passage in particular in Chapter 27 of Science of Survival has been singled out for criticism by opponents of Scientology. In it, Hubbard states that

The sudden and abrupt deletion of all individuals occupying the lower bands of the tone scale from the social order would result in an almost instant rise in the cultural tone and would interrupt the dwindling spiral into which any society may have entered. It is not necessary to produce a world of clears in order to have a reasonable and worthwhile social order; it is only necessary to delete those individuals who range from 2.0 down, either by processing them enough to get their tone level above the 2.0 line — a task which, indeed, is not very great, since the amount of processing in many cases might be under fifty hours, although it might also in others be in excess of two hundred — or simply quarantining them from the society. A Venezuelan dictator  once decided to stop leprosy. He saw that most lepers in his country were also beggars. By the simple expedient of collecting and destroying all the beggars in Venezuela an end was put to leprosy in that country.

Critics, such as the French Government's Anti-cult interministerial mission, believe that forcibly quarantining all human beings that are classified low on Scientology's tone scale would be a violation of human rights.

Furthermore, the book's claims that "adders are safe bedmates compared to people on the lower bands of the tone scale" and that it is one's "level on the tone scale which gives [him or her] value" have also come under fire.

Hubbard has also been criticized for the strong opposition to abortion, which he displays in the book, in which he says that "America spends [billions] yearly on institutions for the insane and jails for criminals ... primarily because of attempted abortions done by some sex-blocked mother to whom children are a curse, not a blessing of God."

Publication history
The book was published in August 1951 and was originally dedicated to his daughter Alexis Valerie Hubbard (whom he later disowned). It was dictated on SoundScriber discs in Havana, Cuba, where Hubbard took refuge when his marriage to his second wife Sara Northrup Hubbard broke down. Author Russell Miller claims Hubbard was in an advanced state of mental deterioration at the time of the book's creation, consuming large quantities of alcohol and addictive prescription drugs, consumed by paranoia and elaborate persecution complexes relating to a wholly fictional attempt by Communists to ruin Dianetics, and was embroiled in a bitter and often surreal custody dispute over his then infant child Alexis.

By the time Science of Survival was published, the public popularity of Dianetics had faded and only one Dianetics Foundation Hubbard Dianetic Research Foundation in Wichita, Kansas, funded by millionaire Dianeticist Don Purcell was still in existence. The Wichita Foundation underwrote the costs of printing the book. It recorded poor sales when first published, with only 1,250 copies of the first edition being printed. However, the book has remained in print as a standard reference work of the Church of Scientology and is listed in its Materials Guide Chart.

A deluxe 50th anniversary revised edition was released in 2001 and a new revised edition in 2007.

See also
 Scientology bibliography

References

Bibliography
 Fischer, Harvey Jay: "Dianetic therapy: an experimental evaluation. A statistical analysis of the effect of dianetic therapy as measured by group tests of intelligence, mathematics and personality." Abstract of Ph.D. thesis, 1953, New York University
 Fox, Jack et al.: An Experimental Investigation of Hubbard's Engram Hypothesis (Dianetics) in Psychological Newsletter, 1959, 10 131-134 
 Minnesota Multiphasic Personality Inventory
 Wechsler-Bellevue Intelligence Scale
 Chris Owen, History of the Personality Test
 Le rapport MILS (1999), a publication of the French government mission Miviludes (Mission interministérielle de vivilance et de lutte contre les dérives sectaires)
 Solitary Trees, an anti-scientology website. Accessed on 16 September 2006.
 Bent Corydon, L. Ron Hubbard: Messiah or Madman?, (Lyle Stuart, 1987)  (ISBN corresponds to a later edition)

External links 
Scientology.org: Science of Survival
ScripturalScientology.org: Science of Survival

1951 non-fiction books
Books published by the Church of Scientology
General semantics
Non-fiction works by L. Ron Hubbard